Heiferman is a surname. Notable people with the surname include:

Marvin Heiferman (born 1948), American curator and writer
Scott Heiferman (born 1972), American community organizer, businessman, and internet entrepreneur